Bazball is an informal cricketing term coined during the 2022 English cricket season. Bazball commonly refers to the style of play of the England national cricket team after the appointments of Brendon McCullum (whose nickname is 'Baz')  as Test cricket head coach, and Ben Stokes as England Test cricket captain, by English cricket managing director Rob Key, in May 2022. The Bazball style and mindset is said to have an emphasis on taking positive decisions in attack and defence, whether batting or in the field.

Origins

Origins of the name
The name "Bazball" was coined by ESPN Cricinfo UK editor Andrew Miller on an episode of the Switch Hit podcast. This came after McCullum’s appointment as England Test cricket coach, in May 2022. McCullum himself has voiced concern that the term can’t express the nuances of the England team’s approach or his management style. The name, however, has picked up increasing use across the wider cricketing media.

Baz is derived from Brendon McCullum’s long standing nickname. As a player he was known for his aggressive stroke play, and as New Zealand captain had a highly-successful period when he used an attacking approach. This approach, Steve McMorran wrote in Associated Press, meant McCullum managed “to upend the Black Caps’ traditional conservative approach and underdog mindset.”

McCullum's tenure as England's coach coincided with a turnaround in the fortunes of the England Test cricket team. The side had won only one Test match in the seventeen played prior to the hiring of Stokes and McCullum, with previous captain Joe Root “emotionally shattered after leading a struggling side through two difficult years which included multiple tours with testing Covid-enforced restrictions“. With no dramatic change to the players selected, England “against all odds” experienced success “their bowlers rose to the challenge, taking 20 wickets in six of the seven Test matches, while their batters scored at unprecedented pace. England won six of their seven Tests this summer, their second-most in a single season anywhere in the world.” Only once (in 2004) had they won more, and in the time since “they had not even matched six wins, let alone bettered it.”

Origins of the style 
One aspect of Bazball is batters taking the skills learned and honed playing one-day cricket and transposing it into the longer form, and traditionally slower, Test match game. Tim Wigmore in The Daily Telegraph wrote that the “path to Bazball runs directly from” the England captaincy of Eoin Morgan in the white-ball form of the game who had overseen a period of success for England, including victory in the 2019 Cricket World Cup. During Morgan’s first summer of captaincy of the England one day team he had urged his team to adopt more of the no-fear approach of the touring New Zealand side captained by Baz McCullum. For his part, Morgan told cricket journalist Firdose Moonda of ESPN Cricinfo that cricket from the Ben Stokes-Brendon McCullum partnership was "some of the best Test match series I've ever watched in my life" and that it was in the process of altering the notions and ideas that had been in place since the inaugural Test in 1877, saying "What England have proved this year [2022] is that you can play Test cricket in that [T20] fashion…It's made for unbelievable entertainment. It's created a new level of interest and proved that you don't have to play Test cricket one way, particularly as a batter, which for, I suppose the 150 years, has always been one way." 

Ben Stokes said the style was discussed from his very first meeting as captain with McCullum, with Stokes telling the media that “I have been thinking stuff like that but the first chat with Baz was ‘yeah we can do it this way – why not?’… It has taken away all the external pressures of playing international sport. There’s enough on individuals and as a team as it is but taking all the other stuff away is why everything is so relaxed, calm and enjoyable at the moment.” He used the example of bowling at Rishabh Pant when he scored a century at greater than a run-a-ball, saying “The more we see players like that succeed, the more the negativity around that type of Test cricket will eventually die out because it is so exciting to watch, because cricket is an entertainment business. Yes, you want results but you want people to enjoy watching a spectacle. Yes, cricket has always been a spectacle but it’s about doing it differently now. So yeah, cheers Rishabh.”

Former Australian fast bowler Glenn McGrath drew parallels with the style of the McCullum-Stokes England team with his own Australian cricket team of the 1990s, but boosted by the changes brought about by white ball cricket, saying ”The team I was lucky enough to play in, we just backed ourselves and played without fear. I think T20, if it’s brought anything to cricket is players, especially batsman, have to go out there and play without fear and that’s moved up through ODIs to Test cricket and they’re starting to play that way. To me, that’s the way everyone should play cricket. When you’ve got a team that goes out there and backs themselves, they play without fear and it’s amazing what you can achieve. With Brendon McCullum coming in, I think he’s definitely bought that attitude.”

Mindset
Ali Martin in The Guardian described the Bazball philosophy as "play positive red-ball cricket; to soak up pressure when required but also be brave enough to put it back on opponents at the earliest opportunity; to make taking wickets the sole aim in the field; and to strive chiefly for victory across the five days without considering the draw".

Cricket writer Chris Stocks identified seven principles of Bazball that could be promoted by a cricket coach in a team environment at the highest level of the game. They are:
A less reflective environment
No negative chat
A win-at-all-costs mentality
No fear of failure
Praise – even for the little things
Simplicity of message
Embracing mental freedom and fun
Stocks quoted veteran pace bowler Stuart Broad discussing the mental side of McCullum's approach when he said: "There's no doubt Baz has had an impact already. It's a very positive language in the changing room. It's very forward thinking. All about how to move this game forward".

Impact on Test matches

2022: Run chases
The change in style of play produced immediate results in the summer of 2022. The England Test match side were playing a three match series against New Zealand and a one-off Test to conclude a previous series postponed by the COVID-19 pandemic against India. The previous summer, India and New Zealand had competed in the 2021 ICC World Test Championship Final. However, England in the summer of 2022 won all four matches chasing a total in the fourth innings, three against New Zealand and one against India, with those fourth innings chases being 277, 299, 296 and 378 runs. They became the first side in Test history to chase three scores of 250-plus in back-to-back games against New Zealand, and the first England side to ever win four consecutive Test matches batting last. Stokes as captain upon winning the toss began routinely in the summer of 2022 choosing to chase, something which goes against the orthodoxy in Test cricket but is the orthodoxy in limited-overs cricket.

Fast scoring rates
On December 1, 2022 England reached a total of 506-4 at the end of first day’s play in a Test match against Pakistan. These runs came in 75 overs at a run rate of 6.75, an unprecedented rate record in Test cricket. Had England faced the full 90 overs of a days play at that run rate they would have passed 600. The previous record for the most runs on day one of a match was 494 set by Australia against South Africa 112 years previously in 1910. This innings also included England’s highest ever total in the first session of a Test (174), Zak Crawley scoring the most runs in the first over of an innings ever by an England player (14), Crawley and Ben Duckett scoring the fastest ever England century opening stand (83 balls), Crawley and Duckett scoring the fastest opening double-century partnership in Test cricket history (181 balls), Harry Brook scoring England’s third fastest century of all time (80 balls), and Crawley (86 balls) scoring the fastest ever by an England opener and the fifth fastest overall. The desire to score quickly has been noted to have had an impact on the batting of Stokes himself who on occasion was “one batsman who has, perhaps, taken things too far on occasion… and fallen cheaply.” On 16 February, 2023 fast scoring rates by the top order allowed England to declare their innings on the first day of a day/night Test match at the Bay Oval in Mount Maunganui on a tour of New Zealand, when the evening conditions were perceived to be a better time to be bowling rather than batting as a side. It was the second earliest declaration in the first innings of a match in the history of Test cricket, and the speed of the scoring rate by the England batters allowed the declaration to be made to suit the conditions with Michael Atherton describing the “boldness” of the declaration as evidence of Stokes “reputation as a captain unwilling to let the game stagnate or drift”.  England batters have also demonstrated innovation when facing Test match bowlers, such as Joe Root playing reverse-ramp shots against pace bowling, and batting left-handed.

Seeking results
A component of Bazball is said to be “confusion-less cricket”, and whilst “attacking all the time is the key, but not attacking blindly is the mantra” with it being “a meticulous approach of never letting the game die and always seeking results.” Speaking after England chased a record run-chase in a Test in Nottingham in June 2022 against New Zealand at Trent Bridge, including a period of 102 runs in nine overs hit by Stokes and Jonny Bairstow, Stokes was quoted as saying "The message just was run into the fear of what the game was rather than standstill or back away from it…I'll say it quite simply: we were either winning this game or losing it. That was the mentality that we wanted all the batters coming in to have…It's obviously paid off. When you have the backing of the coach and captain, it rubs off on the players in a very positive way. So you're not fearing failure. You're just going out and doing what you want to do." Stokes was quoted as using 'positivity' and 'aggression' which would involve risking defeat if it provides a better chance of winning. An aggressive, high-risk high-reward style was noted with England’s leading all time wicket taker James Anderson quoted as saying "We've got a captain and coach that don't want draws. We're not playing for draws." The desire to seek results to Test matches led to a Stokes declaration in Rawalpindi against Pakistan that was seen as a risk and “about 50 runs shy of what experts felt would be the ideal score to have enough cushion”, only to win by 74 runs after giving Pakistan the chance to win they played less defensively, leading to former Australian cricketer and now commentator Mark Waugh saying "Courageous, fearless positive mindset gets them a win in Rawalpindi on the most docile surface. I don't think any other team in world cricket would have rolled the dice like that."

Aggressive fields and bowling changes
Former Australian captain Ricky Ponting discussed the change brought about to the English Test team commenting on how McCullum had managed to “change the attitude of some of the English players to not be scared about getting out and to be fully committed to thinking about scoring runs and when you get the ball in your hand to be as aggressive as you can and set nice and aggressive fields.” The England bowling unit under Stokes captaincy has seen him encourage fast bowlers to bowl fuller, not to protect their bowling figures over moving the game forward, and to be prioritising wickets over run protection at all times. This has not always been the convention in test match cricket. England off-spin bowler Jack Leach was quoted as saying “In teams I’ve played in, the way I’ve thought – a lot of the decisions are made around negativity…Stokes is going out the opposite way.” On the tour of Pakistan in late 2022 Stokes use of “wacky” fielding positions and bowling changes was said to have helped his side achieve a series victory. The “aggressive field settings and constant tinkering” led McCullum to say that Stokes "is determined not just to drive this team but cricket forward. He seems to have taken captaincy to a new level…What we see on the field pulling the strings…he's constantly active, making plays and always thinking about wickets and he's so consistent with his message that he doesn't care about runs. That's one thing…his general positivity is quite staggering." Tactics in the field included moving fielders constantly, changing bowlers to improve match-ups, and utilising unconventional fielding positions including the use of leg slips, three men in front of square, and a back-stop.

Nighthawk
The Bazball era of English test cricket has seen the team at times eschew the traditional use of a nightwatchman, in favour of a ‘nighthawk’. During the English summer test matches of 2022 on occasion Stuart Broad would be padded-up for the last few overs of the day in order that, if called-upon, he could attempt a few late evening blows to accelerate the scoring and cheer the crowd. Broad told Sky Sports that it was in England’s first innings against New Zealand on his home ground of Trent Bridge in 2022 that McCullum suggested it to him, somewhat unexpectedly, “I went to make a coffee, in my flip flops, and Baz  came up and said, 'you are in next, get your pads on. I think the crowd has gone a bit quiet, you are a local boy so try and hit your first ball for four and get them revved up again'.” Broad, however, was never required in the role, and it was later on in the year that 18 year-old spin bowler Rehan Ahmed first got to be nighthawk, promoted to bat at number three in the Test match in Karachi against Pakistan on 19 December, 2022. Broad would make his debut in the nighthawk role on 17 February, 2023 in England's second innings in the first test in a series of two against New Zealand. He told BBC Sport that he was lying on the physio's bed when Brendon McCullum walked through the door and said "Hawk, it's time…You're going in next."

Impact on wider game

Domestic English game
Changes in English domestic cricket came about in order to encourage an increased prevalence in the style of play closer to that sought by the England Test match team. Ahead of the 2023 English cricket season it was announced that attacking play would be encouraged in the County Championship, with fewer points awarded for drawn matches and maximum batting points only available to teams able to score at more than four runs an over. In January 2023, England captain Ben Stokes, managing director Rob Key, and Brendon McCullum over Zoom, addressed a meeting of directors of cricket from the first-class counties to discuss the way they intend the England team to play and the subsequent qualities needed in future international players. It was said they were looking to develop a culture in which no constraints of past processes exist, with a focus on optimising each players unique strengths. This didn’t mean each player had to play in the same buccaneering style as had been England’s hallmark under McCullum and Stokes, but the style which best showcases them with a recognition that batsmen play the best when they can be mentally free. Jarrod Kimber when writing  about McCullum’s spell as New Zealand captain suggests that this has been a consistent theme for him, with Kimber writing “BazBall was a lifestyle choice…McCullum was just as happy to boost up [wicket-keeper] BJ Watling blocking as he was looking for players to smack it. It was about intent, invention and commitment. He was happy to let them fly and be the best versions of themselves”.

Test cricket as a whole
With the popularity of the red ball game waning in some areas of the world and with some cricket administrators prioritising the white ball game, Paul Sutton writing for The Roar said “ BazBall [could] not only revitalise England’s cricket team but also give the game’s traditional format the shot in the arm it so desperately needs.” Revitalise was also a word used by former Australia captain Ricky Ponting when he told the ICC Review "So far it has been unbelievable, and it has actually almost reinvigorated Test match cricket again.” Former Pakistan captain Urooj Mumtaz was quoted as saying after England played in Pakistan in December 2022 “England can be really proud. They‘re revolutionising Test cricket. They wanted to give Test cricket the life that it deserved. They want to be entertaining. And they’ve surely done that here in Pakistan.” Speaking after his first English summer as England coach McCullum discussed the responsibility to make the game appealing saying "you look at where Test cricket is around the world and how important it is to all of those who have played the game beforehand, and the relevance of it in international cricket. For us, it was a matter of trying to bring a bit of enjoyment back, try and bring the fans in to make sure they're enjoying Test cricket, and hopefully provide a bit more relevance to a game which has probably been under a little bit of pressure of late. That was the big goal and it will continue to be so moving forward."

Criticism
Former England captain Andrew Flintoff was quoted as saying “Bazball is one of the worst things I've ever heard, England are just playing exciting cricket”.

The perceived aggression has been criticised by some, with Simon Wilde writing in The Times on June 10, 2022 after England inserted New Zealand felt “Stokes’s decision at the toss to bowl first may have fitted England’s new philosophy — attack, attack, attack — but there were not many times during this day when it looked like he had made the right call.” Cricket writer Huw Tuberville writing in The Cricketer in September 2022 said “I worry that Stokes’ batting aggression – CricViz says he attacked 41 per cent of balls this summer compared to 24 per cent in 2019 – is underselling his talents.” Indian spinner Ravichandran Ashwin also cautioned against not adapting olay to suit conditions, saying that playing on “certain types of wickets, when you try and attack every ball, you will falter. There are both advantages and disadvantages to this approach. Sometimes, on the wicket, conditions need to be respected.”

Whether the style would bear scrutiny against all opposition has been questioned. Former England opener Geoff Boycott was forthright and scathing in his assessment on the Daily Telegraph’s Tuffers and Vaughany podcast, saying “If you think you are going to plunder the best bowlers in the world with a new conker when they are fresh then you are an idiot.” Speaking after South Africa’s series defeat in September 2022, South African captain Dean Elgar said he doubted the staying power of Bazball as a playing style because although it “..is quite interesting, I don’t see that there’s longevity in brave cricket because I see things evening out over time in Test cricket”. Australian batter Steve Smith also questioned the longevity of the approach saying he was “intrigued to see how long it lasts, if it’s sustainable, if you come on a wicket that’s got some grass and Josh Hazlewood, Cummins and Starc are rolling in at you. Is it going to be the same?” Former Australian pace bowler Geoff Lawson questioned if the Bazball style would continue against the Australian fast bowlers and predicted the Australian team would not go the same way, asking “does Bazball  work for him or against him? Would Marnus Labuschagne forgo a 200-ball century for 50-ball 70? Nah. I can’t see the Australians casting aside their cricket DNA for a theory. The England team has the right ingredients at the moment of the young and the reckless to cook up a Bazball cake. Australia would have to wait for the next Test generation composed of white-ball smiters.” 

During season two of the Amazon Prime Video documentary series following the Australia team entitled The Test, the Australian players were seen to have scribbled Ronball on their dressing room door in honour of their coach Andrew McDonald’s nickname, seen as a satire on the Bazball monicker given by the English press.

References

Cricket terminology
Cricket captaincy and tactics
2022 neologisms